National Priority Area is an area that the Israeli government declared it to be a preferential area, and as a result that, communities within the boundaries of these areas are granted with various economic perquisites and incentives. 

Economy of Israel